OS X Mavericks (version 10.9) is the 10th major release of macOS, Apple Inc.'s desktop and server operating system for Macintosh computers. OS X Mavericks was announced on June 10, 2013, at WWDC 2013, and was released on October 22, 2013, worldwide.

The update emphasized battery life, Finder improvements, other improvements for power users, and continued iCloud integration, as well as bringing more of Apple's iOS apps to OS X. Mavericks, which was named after the surfing location in Northern California, was the first in the series of OS X releases not only for being named for places in Apple's home state since earlier releases used the names of big cats, but also for being the first one to be a free upgrade since Mac OS X 10.1 "Puma". It also removed some of the skeuomorphic designs from OS X Mountain Lion, and it is the final Mac operating system to feature the Lucida Grande typeface as the standard system font since Mac OS X Public Beta in 2000.

History
Apple announced OS X Mavericks on June 10, 2013, during the company's Apple Worldwide Developers Conference (WWDC) keynote (which also introduced iOS 7, a revised MacBook Air, the sixth-generation AirPort Extreme, the fifth-generation AirPort Time Capsule, and a redesigned Mac Pro). During a keynote on October 22, 2013, Apple announced that the official release of 10.9 on the Mac App Store would be available immediately, and that unlike previous versions of OS X, 10.9 would be available at no charge to all users running Snow Leopard (10.6.8) or later.

On October 22, 2013, Apple offered free upgrades for life on OS X and iWork.

System requirements
OS X Mavericks can run on any Mac that can run OS X Mountain Lion; as with Mountain Lion, 2 GB of RAM, 8 GB of available storage, and Mac OS X 10.6.8 (Snow Leopard) or later are required. Mavericks and later versions are all available for free.

The full list of compatible models:

iMac (Mid 2007 or later)
MacBook (Aluminum, Late 2008 or later)
MacBook Air (Late 2008 or later)
MacBook Pro (Mid 2007 or later)
Mac Mini (Early 2009 or later)
Mac Pro (Early 2008 or later)
Xserve (Early 2009)

System features
The menu bar and the Dock are available on each display. Additionally, AirPlay compatible displays such as the Apple TV can be used as an external display. Mission Control has been updated to organize and switch between Desktop workspaces independently between multiple displays.

OS X Mavericks introduced App Nap, which sleeps apps that are not currently visible. Any app running on Mavericks can be eligible for this feature by default.

Compressed Memory is a virtual memory compression system which automatically compresses data from inactive apps when approaching maximum memory capacity.

Timer coalescing is a feature that enhances energy efficiency by reducing CPU usage by up to 72 percent. This allows MacBooks to run for longer periods of time and desktop Macs to run cooler.

Apple now supports OpenGL 4.1 Core Profile and OpenCL 1.2. Server Message Block version 2 (SMB2) is now the default protocol for sharing files, rather than AFP. This is to increase performance and cross-platform compatibility.

Some skeuomorphs, such as the leather texture in Calendar, the legal pad theme of Notes, and the book-like appearance of Contacts, have been removed from the UI.

iCloud Keychain stores a user's usernames, passwords and Wi-Fi passwords to allow the user to fill this information into forms when needed.

The system has native LinkedIn sharing integration.

IPoTB (Internet Protocol over Thunderbolt Bridge) Thunderbolt networking is supported in Mavericks. This feature allows the user to quickly transfer a large amount of data between two Macs.

Notification Center allows the user to reply to notifications instantly, allows websites to send notifications, and, when the user wakes up a Mac that was in a sleep state, displays a summary of missed notifications before the machine is unlocked. Some system alerts, such as low battery, removal of drives without ejecting, and a failed Time Machine backup have been moved to Notification Center.

The "traffic light" close, minimize, and maximize window buttons have appeared somewhat brighter than Mac OS X Lion and OS X Mountain Lion.

App features
Finder gets enhancements such as tabs, full-screen support, and document tags. Pinch-to-zoom and swipe-to-navigate-history gestures have been removed, although both are supported anywhere else.

The new iBooks application allows the user to read books purchased through the iBooks Store. The app also allows the user to purchase new content from the iBooks Store, and a night mode to make it easier to read in dark environments.

The new Maps application allows the user the same functionality as in iOS Maps.

The Calendar app has enhancements such as being able to add Facebook events, and an estimate for the travel time to an event.

The Safari browser has a significantly enhanced JavaScript performance which Apple claims is faster than Chrome and Firefox. A Top Sites view allows the user to quickly access the most viewed sites by default. However, the user can pin or remove websites from the view. The sidebar now allows the user to view their bookmarks, reading list and shared links. Safari can also auto-generate random passwords and remember them through iCloud Keychain.

Removed functionality
The Open Transport API has been removed. USB syncing of calendar, contacts and other information to iOS devices has been removed, instead requiring the use of iCloud. QuickTime 10 no longer supports many older video codecs and converts them to the ProRes format when opened. Older video codecs cannot be viewed in Quick Look. Apple also removed the ability to sync mobile iCloud Notes if iOS devices were upgraded from iOS 8 to iOS 9, effectively forcing all Mavericks users to update or upgrade their computers.

Reception
OS X Mavericks has received mixed reviews.

One complaint is that Apple removed the local sync services, which forces users to get iCloud to sync iOS devices with the desktop OS. However, this feature has since returned in the 10.9.3 and ITunes 11.2 updates.

The Verge stated that OS X Mavericks was “a gentle evolution of the Mac operating system”.

Release history

Timeline

See also
Aqua (user interface)
macOS version history
List of Macintosh software

References

9
X86-64 operating systems
2013 software
Computer-related introductions in 2013